Pegasus is a British period television drama series which aired in four parts on BBC 1 in 1969. It is a sequel of the 1968 series Triton which focused on two British naval officers battling a Napoleonic plot to invade Britain with the aid of submarines. In the sequel the two officers return to try and foil a ploy to use hot air balloons to bombard the naval base at Portsmouth at the time of Trafalgar.

Principal cast
 Jonathan Adams as Captain Julius Belwether
 Paul Grist as Lieutenant Simon Lamb
 Robert Cawdron as Robert Fulton
 John Abineri as  Louis Rene Lavassoir Latouche
 Kynaston Reeves as Lord Barham
 Tony Caunter as  Sir William Congreve
 Terry Scully as Lord Nelson

References

Bibliography
Ellen Baskin. Serials on British Television, 1950-1994. Scolar Press, 1996.
 Sue Parrill. Nelson's Navy in Fiction and Film: Depictions of British Sea Power in the Napoleonic Era. McFarland, 2009.

External links
 

BBC television dramas
1969 British television series debuts
1969 British television series endings
English-language television shows